Ian Dunn may refer to:

 Ian Dunn (activist) (1943–1998), Scottish activist
 Ian Dunn (rugby union) (born 1960), New Zealand rugby union player